RLY (an acronym for Real Like You) are an English pop music girl group formed on The X Factor: The Band. They went onto win the series, subsequently signing to Syco Music. The band is composed of Halle Williams, Virginia Hampson, Kellimarie Willis, Jess Folley and Kyra West. In 2022, they got signed to Warner Records.

History
In November 2019, each member of RLY auditioned for the ITV talent competition series The X Factor: The Band. Each member progressed to the bootcamp stage, where Jess Folley (who in 2017 had won The Voice Kids), Luena Martínez (who appeared in series 13), Seorsia Jack, Halle Williams and Kellimarie Willis (who in 2017 appeared on Got What It Takes?) were selected to be in the group. However, judge Nicole Scherzinger later called Virginia Hampson back, giving her a place in the group. On 15 December 2019, RLY were announced as the winners, winning a record deal with Syco. As part of the competition they performed an original song, "Be Like Them". Unlike winners of The X Factor and The X Factor: Celebrity, RLY are the first winners of a British version of the show not to release a winners single following their win. 

After their win on The X Factor: The Band, Folley expressed that the group intend on releasing an album that is "new and original", and writing for the album started in January 2020. On 29 August 2020, Jack announced her departure from the group, stating that she wanted to pursue a solo career. On 9 August 2022, Martínez's departure from RLY was announced and the group became signed to Warner Records. On 2nd January 2023, a new member, Kyra West, was announced on the groups social media pages.

On 6th January 2023, the group teased new music with an unreleased demo called 'Love Me Or Not', which was uploaded to their SoundCloud.

Members

Current members
Halle Williams (born 1 November 2000) was born in Cambridge. Williams is a trained dancer, having studied dance and musical theatre at Urdang Academy.

Virginia Hampson (born 11 October 2002) was born in Chelmsford. Hampson has no formal vocal training. Upon her initial audition for The X Factor: The Band, she was told to audition again, at a later point in the day. At the second audition round, she was cut from the band; Nicole Scherzinger called her three days later and added her to the band. 

Kellimarie Willis (born 27 October 2002) was born in Coventry. In 2017, Willis competed in the second series of Got What It Takes? winning a sing-off and advanced to the semi final, at the age of 13. Willis is studying songwriting in Birmingham.

Jess Folley (born 11 May 2003) was born in Essex. In 2017, Folley won the first series of The Voice Kids.

Kyra West was announced as a new member in January 2023; she had previously been a semi-finalist on the 2017 series of Got What It Takes?.

Past members
Seorsia Jack (born 22 June 2001) was born in Dublin, Ireland, to Zimbabwean parents. She started her career as a solo female artist in 2019. She announced her departure from the band on 29 August 2020 on Instagram, after deciding to pursue a solo career.

Luena Martínez (born 11 January 1999) was born in East Finchley. In 2016, Martínez auditioned for the thirteenth series of The X Factor, where she made it to the six chair challenge, but failed to proceed further. She attended SoundSkool in Enfield. Her departure from the band was announced on 9 August 2022.

References

2019 establishments in England
21st-century British women singers
British pop girl groups
British vocal groups
Musical groups established in 2019
Musical groups from Birmingham, West Midlands 
Syco Music artists
The X Factor (British TV series) winners
Warner Records artists